Maria Teresa Pelegrí i Marimón (4 March 1907– 18 March 1996) was a Spanish composer. She was born in Barcelona and studied piano as a child. When she married, she gave up her musical activities, but after twenty years renewed her interest. She studied piano with Joan Gibert and Carles Pellicer, counterpoint and fugue with Josep Poch and composition with Josep Soler. She also took classes on twentieth-century music with Carles Guinovart.

Personal papers (scores) of Maria Teresa Pelegrí are preserved in the Biblioteca de Catalunya.

Works
Selected works include:
Praeludium und Tiento for organ (1975)
Quatre chansons sentimentales: "Le coucher du soleil romantique", text Charles Baudelaire; "L'heure exquise", text of Paul Verlaine; "Autome" [sic for "Automne"], text by Guillaume Apollinaire; "Saisir", text by Jules Supervielle
Per a Viola i Piano
Duetto for Cello and Piano
First String Quartet (1974)
Second String Quartet (1984)
Third String Quartet
Tocatta for nine
Passacaglia for Wind, bass, percussion
Variations for orchestra
Tragic poem for orchestra, inspired by La casa de Bernarda Alba of Federico García LorcaSinfonietta for wood and string orchestraConcerto for Violin and OrchestraContrasts for OrchestraTwo Songs for Mixed Choir: "Spring", "Infant Joy", texts of William Blake (1976)Requiem for flute, cello, organ and choirHerodes und Mariamne'' Opera in two acts according to the text of the tragedy by Friedrich Hebbel (1984)

References

External links 

 Personal papers of Maria Teresa Pelegrí in the Biblioteca de Catalunya

1907 births
1995 deaths
20th-century classical composers
Spanish music educators
Spanish women classical composers
Spanish classical composers
20th-century Spanish musicians
Women music educators
20th-century women composers